The Dolorosa Madonna is a Madonna painting by the Spanish artist Bartolomé Esteban Murillo. The work is oil on canvas and was painted in 1665. 

It is located in the Museo de Bellas Artes de Sevilla in Seville, Spain.

See also
 Roman Catholic Marian art

Paintings of the Virgin Mary
1665 paintings
Paintings by Bartolomé Esteban Murillo